Julie Palmer is a New Zealand based sedimentologist. She is currently a Senior Lecturer at Massey University. Her key research focus is the stratigraphy and sedimentary systems of the Taranaki oil and gas fields, and the Wanganui-Manawatu Basins.

Palmer's latest research is focussed on young sedimentary systems studying the aquifers and groundwater in the Whanganui-Manawaty region for their application to rural and urban development in these regions.

Early life and education 
Palmer did her undergraduate degree at Victoria University of Wellington, gaining a BSc in 1975 and a BSc (Hons) in 1976. She then stayed on at Victoria University to gain her MSc in 1979 before being one of the first women to be appointed into the New Zealand geoscience industry as an exploration geologist to Petrocorp (later Fletcher Petroleum). During which she spent time on offshore drilling rigs, indeed she was involved in the exploration of the McKee oilfield in the early 1980s. Palmer became the Regional Manager for SE Asia in 1989–1992 before she was appointed as a lecturer in Earth Sciences at Massey University in 1994.

Career and impact 
Palmer applies industry experience to her undergraduate teaching and post-graduate supervision. She also has a keen interest in geoheritage and geoeducation, sharing her knowledge of Earth Science with schools and society. Palmer was the first women president of the Geological Society of New Zealand 2002–2003, having reached this position through progressive commitment to the society as secretary then treasurer.

References 

Living people
Year of birth missing (living people)
Victoria University of Wellington alumni
Academic staff of the Massey University
New Zealand earth scientists
New Zealand women academics